Clay Gould Ballpark (formerly Allan Saxe Stadium and Arlington Athletic Center), the home field of the UT Arlington Mavericks, is located on the campus of The University of Texas at Arlington (UT Arlington). The stadium has a seat capacity of 1,600.  Clay Gould Ballpark is located at the intersection of West Park Row Drive and Fielder Road.

Features
Undergoing constant renovation, the stadium features are steadily changing and growing to increase the fan and player amenities. Fans enter the stadium through a brick entrance way behind home plate. Just to the west of the entrance is a three-booth ticket window.

Clay Gould is composed of three grandstands: the main section behind home plate, which is composed entirely of chair-back seats with partial cover from a metal awning, and two aluminum bleachers, one on the first-base line and the other on the third-base side. There is a small section of ground-level, chair-back seating in front of the main grandstands, directly behind home plate. Underneath the center section is a concession stand while the men's restroom is behind the first-base stands and the women's is behind the third-base seating.

Above the center seats is a press box that contains space for print media and two broadcast booths. The entrance to the press box is just to the left as one enters the stadium, via either a stairway or elevator.

One the first base side is the Mavericks' clubhouse, which includes a combination locker room-lounge for the players, coaches offices and locker rooms, sports training facility, equipment and laundry rooms, mud room and a welcome lobby.

The clubhouse is adjacent to the Justin D. Wilson batting facility, a  indoor practice space. It contains batting cages, pitching mounds and the ability to allow for an open practice when needed.

The Mavericks' bullpen is between the clubhouse and playing field and is located just past first base. The visitors bullpen is located down from the visitors bullpen at third base in left field, at the edge of the stadium.

There are four light poles in the outfield and two on each foul line, for a total of eight light poles.

Out front of the stadium is an L-shaped, 318-space parking lot, shared with nearby Allan Saxe Field and the UTA intramural fields.

History

When UT Arlington first fielded a baseball program in 1969, they played their games at Turnpike Stadium, a minor league stadium first owned by Tarrant County and then the City of Arlington, with an initial seating capacity of 10,000. While playing in Turnpike, the Mavericks amassed a home record of 57–55.

UT Arlington athletic officials knew the Washington Senators were on the verge of relocating from Washington, D.C. They began preparations for an on-campus venue to avoid the scheduling conflicts that would emerge from a college team sharing a major league team's stadium, particularly later in the season after the professional season began. The Texas Rangers had a clause that allowed them to control events at the now renamed Arlington Stadium 24 hours before and after their games. The teams shared Arlington Stadium for the 1972 and 1973 seasons.

Originally named the Arlington Athletic Center, the stadium was built in conjunction with the softball venue, now known as Allan Saxe Field, on the southwesternmost corner of the University campus.

The stadium stayed as completed until the field was replaced in 1986.

Renaming and renovations

The baseball stadium portion of the Arlington Athletic Center was renamed Allan Saxe Stadium in 1999 after popular Professor Allan Saxe's gifts made renovations possible, which included a three-foot-high brick wall that spans from dugout to dugout and a new net backstop. Professor Saxe also contributed to renovations for UT Arlington softball field, and it was renamed Allan Saxe Field six years earlier.

Allan Saxe Stadium was once again renamed a few years later after Clay Gould, a UT Arlington player from 1989 to 1993 and the program's fourth head coach (1999–2001). Gould died of Colon Cancer on June 23, 2001. The renaming was urged by Professor Saxe and coincided with a fundraiser to further enhance the stadium, with a new exterior and entryway, press box improvements, replacement of a chain link outfield fence with wooden fencing and a batters eye, expanded seating capacity and a new state-of-the-art lighting system, allowing the stadium to play night games for the first time.

Clay Gould's memorial plaque was unveiled at the main entryway during the dedication of the newly renamed stadium on April 26, 2003, prior to a conference game with Louisiana-Monroe.

A Daktronics Prostar LED Display video board replaced the older, outdated scoreboard in left center field in 2009. Additionally, the fan experience was upgraded as well by adding new seats to replace worn, older seating in the center grandstand.

The following year, a "brag board" was added immediately next to the scoreboard in left center field that lists the UT Arlington players who have made the Major League Baseball level as well as the retired numbers of the UT Arlington Mavericks baseball program. There are currently 11 Major League Mavericks and three retired numbers, two of which are former coaches.

Construction of an indoor practice facility was started and completed during the offseason prior to the 2013 season. The $1.95 million venue was built in conjunction with an indoor practice space at the softball field, allowing practices to occur during inclement weather. The Justin D. Wilson batting facility was funded with a large portion of previously approved bond proceeds, but also included philanthropic support. Among those supporters is alumnus Roy D. Wilson and his wife Patti, who have been Maverick baseball supporter for many years. Wilson's son was a frequent participant in UT Arlington baseball summer camps before he died in 2010 at age 13.

The UT System board of regents approved $5.5 million to continue renovations at the stadium in August 2013. The funds financed work that included the construction of a clubhouse on stadium grounds near the first base side, next to the indoor practice facility. In addition to a clubhouse for Allan Saxe Field, the renovation provided upgrades and improvements with a new home dugout, new outfield fencing, a picnic area for fans between the visitors dugout and bullpen, a new public address system and stadium branding. Work began following the completion of the 2014 season and was completed just after the start 2015 season. Previously, Maverick baseball players had to dress out of Maverick Stadium, across and down West Mitchell Street, and drive the half-mile to Clay Gould Ballpark, then return to shower after games or practices.

Further renovations are in the planning phase.

Program history

The Mavericks have maintained a winning record of 884–531 on their home field, for a winning percentage of .625 (as of the end of the 2021 season). During that time, UT Arlington has averaged over 20 home wins a season.

Clay Gould Ballpark routinely hosts major opponents, including the Big XII's Baylor, Kansas State, Oklahoma, Oklahoma State, TCU and Texas Tech, the Pac-12's Utah, the SEC's Alabama, Arkansas and Texas A&M and the Big Ten's Illinois, Minnesota, Nebraska and Northwestern.

For the 2022 season, notable home games scheduled at Clay Gould Ballpark are TCU, Michigan, Nebraska and Army as well as five three-game series' against Sun Belt conference opponents, including in-state rival Texas State.

The Mavericks have played TCU at Clay Gould a record 79 times, more than any other team, followed by former Southland Conference foes McNeese State and Lamar with 59 and 57 respectively. Baylor fourth with 56, while Louisiana Tech rounds out the top five with 54 trips to The Gould. Texas State, the three-time conference opponent, is right behind at 53.

Clay Gould Ballpark was home to the 1990 and 1992 Southland Conference regular season champions, the 2001, 2006 and 2012 Southland Conference tournament champions, the 2013 Western Athletic Conference regular season co-champions and the 2017 Sun Belt West Division champions.

Other uses
A short film directed, written and produced by Clay's wife Julie Gould, and starring their child Logan Soul Gould, debuted at the 2011 SXSW Film Festival in Austin, Texas, was shot on the UT Arlington campus and Clay Gould Ballpark. This film, "8", took home the 2011 Texas Shorts Jury Prize Award.

Besides UT Arlington baseball, the diamond has played host to the Texas State Junior College Tournament, the state American Amateur Baseball Congress Connie Mack and American Legion Tournaments and numerous high school playoff games. It also served as the venue for Major League tryout camps.

Nolan Ryan, Alex Rodriguez, Roger Clemens, Ozzie Smith and Ian Kinsler have made appearances at the Ballpark for individual workouts, commercials,
camps and clinics.

See also
 List of NCAA Division I baseball venues

References

Baseball venues in the Dallas–Fort Worth metroplex
UT Arlington Mavericks sports venues
UT Arlington Mavericks baseball
Baseball venues in Texas